The Cynthia Woods Mitchell Center for the Arts is a creative and performing arts space based at the University of Houston. The Center invites artists and creative thinkers to the university to showcase their work, develop new projects, lead workshops, and teach courses. The Center commissions and produces new works.

The center was founded in 2003 to promote innovative collaboration and interchange between artists. The center also forms a hub for the five arts school at the University of Houston: the School of Art, the Moores School of Music, the School of Theatre and Dance, the Creative Writing Program, and the Blaffer Art Museum.

History
The Mitchell Center was founded in 2003 with the goal of uniting the arts programs on the University of Houston campus. Funding for the Mitchell Center came from a contribution from philanthropist and business man, George P. Mitchell, whose desire was to impact the creative arts programs at University of Houston. The Center was named in honor of his late wife, Cynthia Woods Mitchell, a strong lover of the arts. 

An endowment of $20 million was given to support the Center, with $16 million designated for the programs and $4 million to renovate the School of Theatre and Dance facility. The renovation included creating new studios, a lobby for the Wortham Theatre, and offices for the newly established Mitchell Center. In December 2005, Karen Farber was hired as the first full-time director.

Residences and special projects
Mitchell Center invites artists for inter-disciplinary residencies on a semester basis.  Projects can be research based, public art, academic, or part of a larger thematic initiative.

Past artists include: 
Terry & Jo Harvey Allen
Philip Glass
Liz Lerman
ETHEL
Fritz Haeg
Big Dance Theater 
The Art Guys
Ronald K. Brown
Negativland
Dick Hebdige
Mark Doty
Joan Tower
Center for Land Use Interpretation 
Marc Bamuthi Joseph 
SIMPARCH 
Jeremy Deller

Education and the Interdisciplinary Art minor (IART)
In 2008, the Mitchell Center created a new minor called the Interdisciplinary Arts Minor (IART), which is available to UH students from all colleges and majors. IART courses are each sponsored by two or more UH departments and taught by a range of faculty and visiting scholars and practitioners. The minor includes academic study in the historic & contemporary examples of interdisciplinary arts and provides opportunities for students of all majors and academic fields to engage in interdisciplinary projects, utilizing the funding & resources of the Mitchell Center.

Mitchell Center also supports an annual Curatorial Fellowship position at Blaffer Art Museum and offers annual scholarships to graduate students who are interested in cross-disciplinary collaboration and who are studying in the fields of Art, Creative Writing, Music, and Theatre.

The Mitchell Center also hosts a series of lectures and conversations with renowned visitors (artists, writers, choreographers, academics, and musicians) to discuss how collaboration has influenced their artistic development. These conversations are meant to encourage communication about cross-disciplinary works and promote deeper engagement and exploration.

In 2007, the Mitchell Center developed the Faculty Affiliate Network (FAN) to connect the arts with other areas of the UH campus.  FAN is meant to create direct communication between visual artists, performers, and writers and colleagues of the UH faculty and staff for collaboration, dialogue, and sharing of expertise.

See also
Lacy M. Johnson

References

External links
Official Web Site

University of Houston campus
Culture of Houston
Music of Houston
Organizations based in Houston
Non-profit organizations based in Houston
2003 establishments in Texas